Dule is a settlement in the Municipality of Škocjan in southeastern Slovenia. Within the municipality, it belongs to the Local Community of Bučka. The municipality lies in the historical region of Lower Carniola and is now included in the Southeast Slovenia Statistical Region.

References

External links
Dule at Geopedia

Populated places in the Municipality of Škocjan